Louis Martin-Chauffier, real name Louis Martin, (24 August 1894, Vannes – 6 October 1980, Puteaux) was a 20th-century French journalist and writer and a Resistant.

Biography

Education 

Louis Martin-Chauffier started medical studies and, after his father's death, passed the École nationale des chartes entry competition, where he was received in 1915. During the First World War, however, he was mobilized as an auxiliary doctor. He resumed his studies in 1919 and became an archivist-palaeographer in 1921, the year of his marriage with Simone Duval (1902–1975), translator and novelist. He was then appointed librarian at the bibliothèque Mazarine, then at Florence (1923–1927).

Interwar period 

In 1922, he published his first novel, La Fissure. During the 1920s, Louis Martin-Chauffier wrote four novels before abandoning this genre, which he did not return to until 1950.

He also collaborated with the publishing house , where he published avant-garde authors such as Blaise Cendrars, writing a presentation to Philippe Soupault as an appendix to Histoire d'un Blanc, or signing the preface of Aspects de la biographie by André Maurois. He also realized translations of classics (Aristophanes, Dante, etc.) for illustrated luxury editions; In the 1930s, he began the first edition of the complete works of André Gide (1932–1939) and worked for more than fifteen years on a study devoted to Chateaubriand, published in 1943 under the title Chateaubriand ou l'obsession de la pureté.

He also had a journalist activity: while being a librarian, he gave articles to various magazines, in particular to La Revue critique des idées et des livres, close to the Action française, then became a religious chronicler for Le Figaro.

Thereafter, he was editor-in-chief of various clearly left oriented weeklies, such as Lu,' 'Vu or Vendredi. In 1938, he became literary director of Match and editorialist in Paris-Soir.

Second World War 

In 1940, he went to the Zone libre with the team of his newspaper. He entered the Resistance, becoming editor-in-chief of one of the most important clandestine newspapers, Libération in 1942. In May, he was arrested by the Gestapo and taken to the prison at Fort-Montluc; then in April 1944 he was transported to German concentration camps, first to Neuengamme and then to Bergen-Belsen At the Liberation of France, he was a delegate to the Provisional Consultative Assembly (July–August 1945) representing prisoners and deported, then continued his career as a journalist and continued to support the newspaper issue of clandestinity: he was the literary director of 'Libération, the daily directed by Emmanuel d'Astier de la Vigerie.

 Post-war 

He then worked for various daily and weekly newspapers: head of the foreign service of Le Parisien libéré, a literary columnist at Paris-Presse et à Paris Match, editor of  Fémina-Illustration .

His work as a novelist and his work in favor of contemporary literature did not make him forget the great classics: he is the publisher of the complete works of La Rochefoucauld in the bibliothèque de la Pléiade.

He also engaged as a former resistant and deported and in the 1950s was one of the targets of the (verbal) attacks of the Holocaust deniers or revisionists of the time (Paul Rassinier, Maurice Bardèche). In 1952, he intervened in Le Figaro littéraire to answer Jean Paulhan's pamphlet, Lettre aux directeurs de la Résistance.

During the Algerian war, he actively participated in a "Commission internationale sur le système concentrationnaire" (International Commission on the Concentration System), which, in 1957 (the time of the Battle of Algiers), conducted an investigation into the repressive system established by the French army.

 Distinctions 
1947: Grand prix de littérature de la SGDL for his entire work.
1957: Grand prix national des Lettres (ministère de la Culture) for his contribution to the influence of French literature.
1962: Prix Breizh for his entire work.

He was elected a member of the Académie des sciences morales et politiques in 1964.

 Main works 
1921: L’Affaire des évêques simoniaques bretons et l’érection de Dol en métropole (848–850), thesis of the École des chartes
1923: Correspondances apocryphes, Mme de Vandeul et Diderot, Choderlos de Laclos, Flaubert, Barbey d'Aurevilly, Marcel Proust, Anatole France... (preface by Pierre Benoit)
1923: La Fissure, novel
1924: Patrice, ou l’indifférent, novel
1925: L’Épervier, novel
1927: L’Amant des honnêtes femmes, novel
1927: Jeux de l’âme, novel
1930: La Paix by Aristophanes, translation
1930: L’Enfer de Dante, translation
1932–1939: Œuvres complètes d’André Gide, edition
1943: Chateaubriand ou l’obsession de la pureté1947: L’homme et la bête, essay
1950: Mon père n’est pas mort, novel
1958: L’Écrivain et la liberté, essay
1964: Œuvres complètes de La Rochefoucauld, edition
1989: Chroniques d’un homme libre Bibliography 
 Jean Imbert, « Louis Martin-Chauffier », in Bibliothèque de l'École des chartes'', 1982, n°140-142,

References

External links 
 La libération de Louis Martin-Chauffier on Reseau-canope.fr
 Louis Martin-Chauffier: L’Homme et la bête review
 Autour de la Lettre aux directeurs de la Résistance de Jean Paulhan

Members of the Académie des sciences morales et politiques
French librarians
French literary critics
20th-century French journalists
French Resistance members
20th-century French writers
École Nationale des Chartes alumni
Prix Sainte-Beuve winners
1894 births
Writers from Vannes
1980 deaths
Le Figaro people